Pradier is a surname. Notable people with the surname include:

 Charles-Simon Pradier (1786–1848), a Swiss engraver.
 Etienne Pradier (born 1965), French magician
 James Pradier (1790–1852), Swiss-born French sculptor
 Perrette Pradier (born 1938), French actress

See also
 Pradiers, commune in the Cantal department in south-central France